Peter Vogel (22 March 1937 – 21 September 1978) was a German film actor. He appeared in more than 60 films between 1954 and 1978. He was born in Munich, Germany and died in Vienna, Austria, after committing suicide. His father was the actor Rudolf Vogel. He was married to the Austrian actress Gertraud Jesserer and is the father of actor-journalist Nikolas Vogel. was interred next to his father at Bogenhausener Friedhof, Germany.

Partial filmography

 The First Kiss (1954) - Mathias Dammerl
 The Flying Classroom (1954) - Der schöne Theodor
 Marianne of My Youth (1955) - Jan
 Her First Date (1955) - Der lange Robby, Schüler
 Hilfe – sie liebt mich (1956) - Max, Oberkellner im "Elysée"
 Banktresor 713 (1957) - (uncredited)
 Widower with Five Daughters (1957) - Fred
 The Big Chance (1957) - Peter Fiedler
 All the Sins of the Earth (1958) - Willi Lenz
 Taiga (1958) - Winter
 False Shame (1958) - Peter Riek
 The Crammer (1958) - Eduard Neureiter
 Stefanie (1958) - Andreas Gonthar
 Wenn die Conny mit dem Peter (1958) - Harry Specht
 The Domestic Tyrant (1959) - Hannes Hartung
 Alle lieben Peter (1959) - Tommy
 Wenn das mein großer Bruder wüßte (1959) - Walter Spatz
 The Man Who Walked Through the Wall (1959) - Hirschfeld - der Intrigant
 Heimat, deine Lieder (1959) - Uwe
 Peter Voss, Hero of the Day (1959) - Prinz José Villarossa
 That's No Way to Land a Man (1959) - Fritz Becker
 The Hero of My Dreams (1960) - Oliver Martens
 Stefanie in Rio (1960) - Andreas 'Andi' Gonthar
 Hauptmann – deine Sterne (1960) - Heini Haase
 The Young Sinner (1960) - Erich Kolp
 Agatha, Stop That Murdering! (1960) - Edgar Karter
  (1961) - Moritz Schröder
 Season in Salzburg (1961) - Hans Stiegler
 Freddy and the Millionaire (1961) - Kunststudent
 Dicke Luft (1962) - Francois Mirage
 Dance with Me Into the Morning (1962) - Detektiv
 Ohne Krimi geht die Mimi nie ins Bett (1962) - Michael Lutz
 Kohlhiesel's Daughters (1962) - Rolf
 Das haben die Mädchen gern (1962) - Peter Werner
 Don't Fool with Me (1963) - Gag-Man Hans Rabe
 Ferien wie noch nie (1963)
 The Black Cobra (1963) - Krim.Ass. Dr. Alois Dralle
 Wochentags immer (1963)
 Charley's Aunt (1963) - Charley Sallmann
 Ferien vom Ich (1963) - Jürgen
 Die ganze Welt ist himmelblau (1964) - Frank
 The Phantom of Soho (1964) - Sergeant Hallam
 Monsieur (1964) - Michel Corbeil
 I Learned It from Father (1964) - Oskar Werner Vischer
 Condemned to Sin (1964) - Hans
 The Seventh Victim (1964) - Butler Irving
 Killer's Carnival (1966) - Wendt, Suspected girls' killer
 Temptation in the Summer Wind (1972) - Freund des Professors
 Kottan ermittelt (1976–1978, TV Series) - Major Adolf Kottan / Oberstleutnant Horeis
 The Unicorn (1978) - Anselm Kristlein

References

External links

1937 births
1978 deaths
German male film actors
German male television actors
Suicides in Austria
Suicides by poison
20th-century German male actors
1978 suicides